Gazuiyeh (also Romanized as Gazū’īyeh) is a village in Khabar Rural District, Dehaj District, Shahr-e Babak County, Kerman Province, Iran. At the 2006 census, its population was 133, in 29 families.

References 

Populated places in Shahr-e Babak County